The Cristalino River is a river of the states of Pará and Mato Grosso in western Brazil. It is a tributary of the Teles Pires.

Course
The river rises in the  Nascentes da Serra do Cachimbo Biological Reserve, a strictly protected conservation unit established in 2005 in the state of Pará.
It is an indirect tributary of the Tapajós.
After crossing the border into Mato Grosso the river flows through the  Cristalino State Park, established in 2001, before entering the  Teles Pires.
The river is navigable throughout the state park,  despite the large number of submerged rocks and small rapids along its course.

See also

List of rivers of Mato Grosso
List of rivers of Pará

References

Sources

Rivers of Mato Grosso
Rivers of Pará